The individual dressage event was one of six equestrian events on the equestrian programme. The competition was held at the Olympic Equestrian Centre in Bromont, Quebec.

The competition was split into two phases:

Grand Prix (29 July)
Riders performed the Grand Prix test. The twelve riders with the highest scores advanced to the final.
Grand Prix Special (30 July)
Riders performed the Grand Prix Special test.

Results

References

External links
1976 Summer Olympics official report Volume 3 p. 546. 

Individual dressage